"Just Call Me Lonesome" is a song written by Rex Griffin and first recorded by Eddy Arnold in 1955, when it reached number two on the U.S. country singles chart. "Just Call Me Lonesome" subsequently appeared on albums by numerous recording artists:
Wanda Jackson, Wanda Jackson (1958)
Jim Reeves, Songs To Warm The Heart (1959)
Red Foley, Kitty Wells, Kitty Wells' & Red Foley's Golden Hits (1961, compilation)
Warren Smith, First Country Collection of Warren Smith (1961)
Billy Walker, Everybody's Hits But Mine (1961)
Slim Whitman, Just Call Me Lonesome (1961, reissued as Portrait)
The Wilburn Brothers, City Limits (1961)
Eddy Arnold, One More Time (1962)
Ernest Tubb, Just Call Me Lonesome (1963)
Jean Shepard, Lighthearted and Blue (1964)
Ray Price, The Other Woman (1965)
Dave Dudley, Lonelyville (1966)
Don Gibson, Don Gibson With Spanish Guitars (1966)
Elvis Presley, Clambake (1967, soundtrack)
Bonnie Guitar, Night Train to Memphis (1969)

See also 
1955 in country music

References 

1955 songs
1955 singles
Eddy Arnold songs
Elvis Presley songs
Slim Whitman songs
Songs written by Rex Griffin
RCA Records singles